Dilbar Abdurahmonova (1 May 1936 – 20 March 2018) was a Russian-born Uzbekistani violinist and conductor. She is recognized as People's artist of Uzbekistan.

Born in Moscow to parents Gulyam Abdurahmanov and Zuhra Faiziyeva, she began learning the violin at the age of 10, and was a student of Mukhtar Ashrafi. Abdurahmonova attended the State Conservatory of Uzbekistan and performed frequently at the Navoi Theatre. She was designated a People's Artist of the USSR in 1977.

Abdurahmonova last performed in December 2017, and was sent to hospital in February 2018. She died on 20 March 2018, aged 81.

References

1936 births
2018 deaths
Musicians from Moscow
Uzbekistani violinists
Women conductors (music)
Soviet conductors (music)
Soviet violinists
People's Artists of the USSR
20th-century conductors (music)
20th-century classical violinists
20th-century women musicians
21st-century conductors (music)
21st-century classical violinists
21st-century women musicians
Uzbekistani classical musicians